Margot and Maroie were two trouvères who wrote a jeu-parti together:

Dame Margot (trouvère)
Dame Maroie